Jeremy Kittel is a contemporary Grammy-nominated American musician and composer.  His primary instruments are the violin / fiddle and viola and his styles include Celtic, Jazz, Classical, Bluegrass, Folk music, and more.  
	
He leads his namesake group, Kittel & Co.  and has worked with many prominent artists, including Béla Fleck, Abigail Washburn, Fleet Foxes, Edgar Meyer, Chris Thile, My Morning Jacket, Yo-Yo Ma, the Silk Road Ensemble, Paquito D’Rivera, Mark O'Connor, Turtle Island Quartet, Jon Batiste, the Assad Brothers, Aoife O'Donovan, Jars of Clay, Stefon Harris, and Darol Anger.

Biography
Kittel grew up in Saline, Michigan.  He attended the University of Michigan School of Music, Theatre & Dance for his undergraduate degree and earned his master's degree in jazz violin from the Manhattan School of Music in 2007.

Jeremy Kittel has performed as a soloist with many orchestras including the Detroit Symphony, Vancouver Symphony, Louisville Orchestra, and Rochester Philharmonic.  He was a guest twice on A Prairie Home Companion and has played in the house band for Live From Here and the Late Night with Stephen Colbert. He has also played the Kennedy Center, Bonnaroo, and Telluride Bluegrass Festival.

'Chrysalis,' a track on his group's 2018 album Whorls, was nominated for a Grammy for Best Instrumental Composition. He has won other awards throughout his career, some of the more notable being the Daniel Pearl Memorial Violin, the Stanley Medal and Emerging Artist Award at the University of Michigan, the Detroit Music Award for Outstanding Folk Artist, Outstanding Jazz Recording and Outstanding Jazz composer, and twice the American String Teacher Association’s Alternative Strings Award. He is a U.S. National Scottish Fiddle Champion and a two-time Junior National Scottish Fiddle Champion.

Discography

Solo recordings

w/Turtle Island String Quartet

Other Recordings, etc.

References

1984 births
Living people
American male composers
21st-century American composers
Manhattan School of Music alumni
American male violinists
University of Michigan School of Music, Theatre & Dance alumni
21st-century American violinists
21st-century American male musicians
Turtle Island Quartet members